In heraldry, an annulet (i.e. "little ring") is a common charge.  It may allude to the custom of prelates to receive their investiture per baculum et annulum ('by rod and ring'), and can also be described as a roundel that has been "voided" (i.e. with its centre cut out).  In English and Canadian heraldry it is also used as the difference mark of a fifth son.

References

Heraldic charges

fr:Liste des meubles héraldiques#Annelet